Tangi is a Tehsil (town as in some places) and union council of Charsadda District in the Khyber Pakhtunkhwa province of Pakistan.

Overview and History 
It is one of eight towns in Hashtnagar and is located at 34°18'0N 71°39'14E with an altitude of 327 metres (1076 feet) lying to the north-west of the district capital - Charsadda.

80% of Tangi's old and local population belongs to Muhammadzai(Hassan khel,Daulat khel,Mula khel,Matooz khel,Nando khel,sahibzadgan,Usman khel,Ibrahim khel,shahbaz khel etc these are also sub branches of muhammadzai) tribe. But there are also some other large Pashtun tribes. In which Mohmand, Utmankhel, Syed ,Piran, Kakakhel Miyagan etc.

The notable attractions of Tangi are Stone built mosque (Gato jumat) Tangi Barazai Daulat Khel, Old Bachayan Hujra (Nasratzai) of Noble Sahibzada Saif-Ur-Rehman Bacha, Old Hindu temple Tangi Barazai Tarra Kocha, Old Hujra Khan Bahadur Mir Alam Khan Tangi Barazai Daulatkhel,  Hujra Daud Khan (Aashiyana Abdul Akbar Khan), Daud Institute of Learning and Motivation (DILM), Government College Tangi, Tangi Bazaar (Barazai), Masjid Abdul Akbar Khan (Nasratzai), Irrigation Canal at Nehr Gara, Tangi Hospital, CHOPAAL-Restaurant, Government High School No 1 old building Tangi Barazai, old British built bridge (tattoono pull) Tangi Barazai, Tarakai Mountain

Some beautiful and scenic picnic spots are Yousaf baba close to Tangi,jhendi pul, CHOPAAL-Restaurant Tangi (Chawatra) and Kanewar is famous for Chappli Kabab.Munda Dam, Abazai mango, and oranges farm.

Some of the notable personalities of Tangi are. Maulana Rehmat ullah jan saib, Maulana Muhammad Akbar (Gandhiri Maulvi Sahib) graduated from Deoband. Shodago Babaji, as well as many famous people including Khan Abdul Akbar Khan, ChaCha Khan, Wawa Khan, Gul Shahzada alias Gul saib, khan bahadur Mir Alam Khan and Shah Pasand Khan. Another famous personality Malik Muhammad Akram Khan Barazai Tangi.  

Akhunzada Haq Nawaz (Sput of Pakistan Army who lost an arm and a leg in Swat operation)

A notable achievement for Tangi came on 25 March 2018 when Dr. Nadeem Jan resident of Tangi Nusratzai Mohallah Fateh Kheil was awarded the prestigious award of Tamgha e Imtiaz

Population 
The population of Tangi, according to the 2017 census, is 33,012. The population of Tangi, according to official consensus, over the years is shown in the table below.

Educational Institutes 
Tangi is home to many good educational institutes. The most notable are Government Degree College Tangi and Govt Girls Degree College Tangi Charsadda.

See also 
 Utmanzai

 Umarzai
 Muhammadzai

External links
 Hashtnagar

References

Union councils of Charsadda District
Populated places in Charsadda District, Pakistan